Karl Orviku (17 August 1903 Kohtla, Ida-Viru County – 7 March 1981 Tallinn) was an Estonian geologist. He specialized in quaternary geology.

In 1930 he graduated from Tartu University with a master's degree in geology.

Since 1926 he worked as the chair of geology at Tartu University. From 1954 to 1968 he was there the director.

Since 1954 he was a member of the ESSR Academy of Sciences.

From 1961 to 1965 he was a member of the executive committee of the International Union for Quaternary Research.

Karl Orviku's son Kaarel Orviku (1935–2021) was marine geologist and nature photographer.

References

1903 births
1981 deaths
Estonian geologists
People from Toila Parish
University of Tartu alumni
Academic staff of the University of Tartu
Soviet geologists
Eesti Loodus editors